Historic recurrence is the repetition of similar events in history.  The concept of historic recurrence has variously been applied to overall human history (e.g., to the rises and falls of empires), to repetitive patterns in the history of a given polity, and to any two specific events which bear a striking similarity.

Hypothetically, in the extreme, the concept of historic recurrence assumes the form of the Doctrine of Eternal Recurrence, which has been written about in various forms since antiquity and was described in the 19th century by Heinrich Heine and Friedrich Nietzsche.

While it is often remarked that "history repeats itself", in cycles of less than cosmological duration this cannot be strictly true.  In this interpretation of recurrence, as opposed perhaps to the Nietzschean interpretation, there is no metaphysics.  Recurrences take place due to ascertainable circumstances and chains of causality.  An example is the ubiquitous phenomenon of multiple independent discovery in science and technology, described by Robert K. Merton and Harriet Zuckerman. Indeed, recurrences, in the form of reproducible findings obtained through experiment or observation, are essential to the natural and social sciences; and, in the form of chance observations rigorously studied via the comparative method, are essential to the humanities.

G.W. Trompf, in his book The Idea of Historical Recurrence in Western Thought, traces historically recurring patterns of political thought and behavior in the west since antiquity.  If history has lessons to impart, they are to be found par excellence in such recurring patterns.

Historic recurrences of the "striking-similarity" type can sometimes induce a sense of "convergence", "resonance" or déjà vu.

Authors

Ancient western thinkers who had thought about recurrence had largely been concerned with cosmological rather than historic recurrence (see "eternal return", or "eternal recurrence").  Western philosophers and historians who have discussed various concepts of historic recurrence include the Greek Hellenistic historian Polybius (ca 200 – ca 118 BCE), the Greek historian and rhetorician Dionysius of Halicarnassus (c. 60 BCE – after 7 BCE), Luke the Evangelist, Niccolò Machiavelli (1469–1527), Giambattista Vico (1668–1744), Correa Moylan Walsh (1862—1936), Arnold J. Toynbee (1889–1975).

An eastern concept that bears a kinship to western concepts of historic recurrence is the Chinese concept of the Mandate of Heaven, by which an unjust ruler will lose the support of Heaven and be overthrown. In the Islamic World, Ibn Khaldun (1332–1406) wrote that Asabiyyah (social cohesion or group unity) plays an important role in a kingdom's or dynasty's cycle of rise and fall.

G.W. Trompf describes various historic paradigms of historic recurrence, including paradigms that view types of large-scale historic phenomena variously as "cyclical"; "fluctuant"; "reciprocal"; "re-enacted"; or "revived". He also notes "[t]he view proceeding from a belief in the uniformity of human nature [Trompf's emphasis].  It holds that because human nature does not change, the same sort of events can recur at any time." "Other minor cases of recurrence thinking," he writes, "include the isolation of any two specific events which bear a very striking similarity [his emphasis], and the preoccupation with parallelism [his emphasis], that is, with resemblances, both general and precise, between separate sets of historical phenomena."

Lessons

G.W. Trompf notes that most western concepts of historic recurrence imply that "the past teaches lessons for... future action"—that "the same... sorts of events which have happened before... will recur..."  One such recurring theme was early offered by Poseidonius (a Greek polymath, native to Apamea, Syria; ca 135–51 BCE), who argued that dissipation of the old Roman virtues had followed the removal of the Carthaginian challenge to Rome's supremacy in the Mediterranean world. The theme that civilizations flourish or fail according to their responses to the human and environmental challenges that they face, would be picked up two thousand years later by Toynbee. Dionysius of Halicarnassus (c. 60 BCEafter 7 BCE), while praising Rome at the expense of her predecessors—Assyria, Media, Persia, and Macedonia—anticipated Rome's eventual decay.  He thus implied the idea of recurring decay in the history of world empires—an idea that was to be developed by the Greek historian Diodorus Siculus (1st century BCE) and by Pompeius Trogus, a 1st-century BCE Roman historian from a Celtic tribe in Gallia Narbonensis.

By the late 5th century, Zosimus (also called "Zosimus the Historian"; fl. 490s–510s:  a Byzantine historian who lived in Constantinople) could see the writing on the Roman wall, and asserted that empires fell due to internal disunity.  He gave examples from the histories of Greece and Macedonia.  In the case of each empire, growth had resulted from consolidation against an external enemy; Rome herself, in response to Hannibal's threat posed at Cannae, had risen to great-power status within a mere five decades.  With Rome's world dominion, however, aristocracy had been supplanted by a monarchy, which in turn tended to decay into tyranny; after Augustus Caesar, good rulers had alternated with tyrannical ones.  The Roman Empire, in its western and eastern sectors, had become a contending ground between contestants for power, while outside powers acquired an advantage.  In Rome's decay, Zosimus saw history repeating itself in its general movements.

The ancients developed an enduring metaphor for a polity's evolution, drawing an analogy between an individual human's life cycle and developments undergone by a body politic: this metaphor was offered, in varying iterations, by Cicero (106–43 BCE), Seneca (c. 1 BCE – 65 CE), Florus (c. 74 CE – ca 130 CE), and Ammianus Marcellinus (between 325 and 330 CE – after 391 CE).  This social-organism metaphor, which has been traced back to the Greek philosopher and polymath Aristotle (384–322 BCE), would recur centuries later in the works of the French philosopher and sociologist Auguste Comte (1798–1857), the English philosopher and polymath Herbert Spencer (1820–1903), and the French sociologist Émile Durkheim (1858–1917). 

Niccolò Machiavelli, analyzing the state of Florentine and Italian politics between 1434 and 1494, described recurrent oscillations between "order" and "disorder" within states:

Machiavelli accounts for this oscillation by arguing that virtù (valor and political effectiveness) produces peace, peace brings idleness (ozio), idleness disorder, and disorder rovina (ruin).  In turn, from rovina springs order, from order virtù, and from this, glory and good fortune.  Machiavelli, as had the ancient Greek historian Thucydides, saw human nature as remarkably stable—steady enough for the formulation of rules of political behavior.  Machiavelli wrote in his Discorsi:

In 1377 the Islamic scholar Ibn Khaldun, in his Muqaddima (or Prolegomena), wrote that when nomadic tribes become united by asabiyya—Arabic for "group feeling", "social solidarity", or "clannism"—their superior cohesion and military prowess puts urban dwellers at their mercy.  Inspired often by religion, they conquer the towns and create new regimes.  But within a few generations, writes Ibn Khaldun, the victorious tribesmen lose their asabiyya and become corrupted by luxury, extravagance, and leisure.  The ruler, who can no longer rely on fierce warriors for his defense, will have to raise extortionate taxes to pay for other sorts of soldiers, and this in turn may lead to further problems that result in the eventual downfall of his dynasty or state.

Joshua S Goldstein suggests that empires, analogously to an individual's midlife crisis, experience a political midlife crisis: after a period of expansion in which all earlier goals are realized, overconfidence sets in, and governments are then likely to attack or threaten their strongest rival; Goldstein cites four examples:  the British Empire and the Crimean War; the German Empire and the First World War; the Soviet Union and the Cuban Missile Crisis; the United States and the Vietnam War.  Suggestions that the European Union is suffering a political midlife crisis have been put forward by Gideon Rachman (2010), Roland Benedikter (2014), and Natalie Nougayrède (2017).

David Hackett Fischer has identified four waves in European history, each of some 150-200 years' duration. Each wave begins with prosperity, leading to inflation, inequality, rebellion and war, and resolving in a long period of equilibrium.  For example, 18th-century inflation led to the Napoleonic wars and later the Victorian equilibrium.

Sir Arthur Keith's theory of a species-wide amity-enmity complex suggests that human conscience evolved as a duality:  people are driven to protect members of their in-group, and to hate and fight enemies who belong to an out-group. Thus an endless, useless cycle of ad hoc "isms" arises.

Similarities

One of the recurrence patterns identified by G.W. Trompf involves "the isolation of any two specific events which bear a very striking similarity".   The Spanish-American philosopher George Santayana observed that "Those who cannot remember the past are condemned to repeat it." Karl Marx, having in mind the respective coups d'état of Napoleon I (1799) and his nephew Napoleon III (1851), wrote acerbically in 1852: "Hegel remarks somewhere that all facts and personages of great importance in world history occur, as it were, twice. He forgot to add: the first time as tragedy, the second time as farce."

However, Poland's Adam Michnik believes that history is not just about the past because it is constantly recurring, and not as farce, as Marx had it, but as itself:  "The world", writes Michnik, "is full of inquisitors and heretics, liars and those lied to, terrorists and the terrorized.  There is still someone dying at Thermopylae, someone drinking a glass of hemlock, someone crossing the Rubicon, someone drawing up a proscription list."

Plutarch's Parallel Lives traces the similarities between pairs of a Roman and a Greek historical figure. 

Poland's Catholic Primate, Stanisław Szczepanowski, is murdered by his former friend, King Bolesław the Bold (1079); and England's Catholic Primate, Thomas Becket, is murdered at the behest of his former friend, King Henry II (1170). 

Mongolian Emperor Kublai Khan's attempted conquest of Japan (1274, 1281) is frustrated by typhoons; and Spanish King Philip II's 1588 attempted conquest of England is frustrated by a hurricane. 

Hernán Cortes's fateful 1519 entry into Mexico's Aztec Empire is reputedly facilitated by the natives' identification of him with their god Quetzalcoatl, who had been predicted to return that very year; and English Captain James Cook's fateful 1778 entry into Hawaii, during the annual Makahiki festival honoring the fertility and peace god Lono, is reputedly facilitated by the natives' identification of Cook with Lono, who had left Hawaii, promising to return on a floating island, evoked by Cook's ship under full sail.

On 27 April 1521, Portuguese explorer Ferdinand Magellan, in the Philippine Islands, foolhardily, with only four dozen men, confronts 1,500 natives who have defied his attempt to Christianize them and is killed. On 14 February 1779, English explorer James Cook, on Hawaii Island, foolhardily, with only a few men, confronts the natives after some individuals have taken one of Cook's small boats, and Cook and four of his men are killed.

Poland's Queen Jadwiga, dying in 1399, bequeaths her personal jewelry for the restoration of Kraków University (which will occur in 1400); and Leland Stanford's widow Jane Stanford attempts, after his 1893 death, to sell her personal jewelry to restore Stanford University's financial viability, ultimately bequeathing the jewelry to fund the purchase of books for Stanford University.

In 1812 French Emperor Napoleonborn a Corsican outsideris unprepared for an extended winter campaign, yet invades the Russian Empire, precipitating the fall of the French Empire; and in 1941 German Führer Adolf Hitlerborn an Austrian outsideris unprepared for an extended winter campaign, yet invades the Russian Empire's Soviet successor state (which is ruled by Joseph Stalin, born a Georgian outsider), thus precipitating the fall of the German Third Reich.

Mahatma Gandhi works to liberate his compatriots by peaceful means and is shot dead; Martin Luther King Jr., works to liberate his compatriots by peaceful means and is shot dead.

Over history, confrontations between peoples – typically, geographical neighbors – help consolidate the peoples into nations, at times into frank empires; until at last, exhausted by conflicts and drained of resources, the once militant polities settle into a relatively peaceful habitus. 

Polities ignore Jan Bloch's 1898 warnings of the railroad-mobilized, industrialized, stalemated, attritional total war, World War I, that is on the way and will destroy an appreciable part of mankind; and polities ignore geologists', oceanographers', atmospheric scientists', biologists', and climatologists' warnings of the climate-change tipping point that is on course to destroy all of mankind.

People ignore warnings about the dangers of nuclear power plants until anticipated nuclear power-plant accidents occur; and people ignore warnings about the dangers of nuclear weapons until some city in the world is blown up by a nuclear weapon. 

Jessica Tuchman Mathews, daughter of The Guns of August author Barbara Tuchman, observes that "[P]owerful reasons to doubt that there could be a limited nuclear war [include] those that emerge from any study of history, a knowledge of how humans act under pressure, or experience of government." Apposite evidence for this is provided in Martin J. Sherwin's Gambling with Armageddon, which makes clear, on the basis of recently declassified documents, that it was a matter of sheer chance that war was averted during the Cuban Missile Crisis: numerous events, had they taken a slightly different course, could each have precipitated nuclear war. 

Fintan O'Toole writes about American war correspondent Martha Gellhorn (1908–98): 

Casey Cep, describing a dissonance between William Faulkner's documented personal racism and Faulkner's depiction of the American Confederacy, writes that Michael Gorra, in The Saddest Words: William Faulkner's Civil War ([Liveright, 2020),
 

British novelist Martin Amis observes that recurring patterns of imperial ascendance-and-decline are mirrored in the novels published; according to Amis, novels follow current political trends. In the Victorian era, when Britain was the ascendant power, British novels were large and tried to express what society as a whole was. British power waned during the Second World War and ended after the war.  The British novel was then some 225 pages long and centered on narrower subjects such as career setbacks or marriage setbacks:  the British novel's "great tradition" increasingly looked depleted.  Ascendance, according to Amis, had passed to the United States, and Americans such as Saul Bellow, Norman Mailer, Philip Roth, and John Updike began writing huge novels.

Novelists and historians have discerned recurrent patterns in the histories of modern political tyrants.

Ruth Ben-Ghiat in Strongmen: Mussolini to the Present (2020), writes Ariel Dorfman, documents the "viral recurrence" around the world, over the past century, of despots and authoritarians "with comparable strategies of control and mendacity." Ben-Ghiat divides the narrative into three – at times, overlapping – periods:

Dorfman notes the absence, from Ben-Ghiat's study, of many authoritarian rulers, including communists like Mao, Stalin, Ceaușescu, and the three Kims of North Korea. Nor is there mention of Indonesia's Suharto or the Shah of Iran, Mohammad Reza Pahlavi, "though the CIA engineered coups that led to both [...] lording it over their lands, and the agency can also be linked to Pinochet's military putsch in Chile." Dorfman believes that Juan Domingo Perón would also have been an instructive example to include in Ruth Ben-Ghiat's study of Strongmen.

British political commentator Ferdinand Mount brings attention to the ubiquitous recurrence of mendacity in politics: politicians lie to cover up their mistakes, to gain advantage over their opponents, or to achieve purposes that might be unpalatable or harmful to their public or to a foreign public. Some notable practitioners of political mendacity discussed by Mount include Julius Caesar, Cesare Borgia, Queen Elizabeth I, Oliver Cromwell, Robert Clive, Napoleon, Winston Churchill, Tony Blair, Boris Johnson, and Donald Trump,

See also

 Amity-enmity complex
 The Anatomy of Revolution
 Big Bang
 Big Bounce (pulsating-universe theory)
 Cliodynamics
 Cyclical theory (United States history)
 Dark (TV series)
 The Decline of the West, a book by Oswald Spengler
 Dynastic cycle
 Eternal return
Exceptionalism
 Eureka: A Prose Poem, by Edgar Allan Poe, 1848 (Big Bang theory)
 Fractal
 Generation Zero
Is the Holocaust Unique?
Lest We Forget
 List of multiple discoveries
 List of pre-modern great powers
 Multiple discovery
Never again
 Peter Turchin
 Philosophy of history
 Repetition, a related concept by Søren Kierkegaard
 The Rise and Fall of the Great Powers
 Smihula waves
 Social cycle theory
 Social physics
 Societal collapse
 State collapse
 Strauss-Howe generational theory
  The True Believer
 Thucydides Trap

Notes

References

Bibliography
 Casey Cep, "Demon-driven: The bigoted views and brilliant fiction of William Faulkner", The New Yorker, 30 November 2020, pp. 87–91.
 Carlo Cercignani, chapter 2:  "Physics before Boltzmann", in Ludwig Boltzmann:  The Man Who Trusted Atoms, Oxford University Press, 1998, .
 David Christian, Maps of Time:  an Introduction to Big History, University of California Press, 2005.
 Jared Diamond, Guns, Germs, and Steel:  the Fates of Human Societies, new ed., W.W. Norton, 2005.
 Ariel Dorfman, "A Taxonomy of Tyrants" (review of Ruth Ben-Ghiat, Strongmen: Mussolini to the Present, Norton, 2020, 358 pp.), The New York Review of Books, vol. LXVIII, no. 9 (27 May 2021), pp. 25–27. 
 The Eighteenth Brumaire of Louis Bonaparte (1852), in Marx Engels Selected Works, volume I.
 Niall Ferguson, Civilization:  The West and the Rest, Penguin Press, 2011.
 Niall Ferguson, "America's 'Oh Sh*t!' Moment," Newsweek, November 7 & 14, 2011, pp. 36–39.
 David Hackett Fischer, The Great Wave: Price Revolutions and the Rhythm of History, Oxford University Press, 1996.
 Joshua S Goldstein, Long Cycles: Prosperity and War in the Modern Age, 1988.
 Gordon Graham, "Recurrence," The Shape of the Past, Oxford University Press, 1997, .
 Marshall G.S. Hodgson, Rethinking World History:  Essays on Europe, Islam, and World History, Cambridge University Press, 1993.
 Walter Kaufmann, Nietzsche: Philosopher, Psychologist, Antichrist, 1959.
 Arthur Keith, A New Theory of Human Evolution, Watts, 1948.
 Paul Kennedy, The Rise and Fall of the Great Powers: Economic Change and Military Conflict from 1500 to 2000, Random House, 1987, .
 Ibn Khaldun, Muqadimmah, 1377.
 Elizabeth Kolbert, "This Close; The day the Cuban missile crisis almost went nuclear" (a review of Martin J. Sherwin's Gambling with Armageddon: Nuclear Roulette from Hiroshima to the Cuban Missile Crisis, New York, Knopf, 2020), The New Yorker, 12 October 2020, pp. 70–73.
 Andrey Korotayev, Arteny Malkov, Daria Khaltourina, Introduction to Social Macrodynamics: Secular Cycles and Millennial Trends., Moscow, 2006, . See especially chapter 2.
 David Lamb and S.M. Easton, Multiple Discovery: The Pattern of Scientific Progress, Amersham, Avebury Press, 1984.
 Pierre-Simon Laplace, A Philosophical Essay, New York, 1902.
 Jackson Lears, "Imperial Exceptionalism" (review of Victor Bulmer-Thomas, Empire in Retreat:  The Past, Present, and Future of the United States, Yale University Press, 2018, 459 pp.; and David C. Hendrickson, Republic in Peril:  American Empire and the Liberal Tradition, Oxford University Press, 2017, 287 pp.), The New York Review of Books, vol. LXVI, no. 2 (February 7, 2019), pp. 8-10.  Bulmer-Thomas writes:  "Imperial retreat is not the same as national decline, as many other countries can attest.  Indeed, imperial retreat can strengthen the nation-state just as imperial expansion can weaken it."  (NYRB, cited on p. 10.)
 Robert K. Merton, The Sociology of Science:  Theoretical and Empirical Investigations, University of Chicago Press, 1973.
 Ferdinand Mount, "Ruthless and Truthless" (review of Peter Oborne, The Assault on Truth: Boris Johnson, Donald Trump and the Emergence of a New Moral Barbarism, Simon and Schuster, February 2021, 192 pp.; and Colin Kidd and Jacqueline Rose, eds., Political Advice: Past, Present and Future, I.B. Tauris, February 2021, 240 pp.), London Review of Books, vol. 43, no. 9 (6 May 2021), pp. 3, 5–8. 
 Fintan O'Toole, "A Moral Witness" (review of Janet Somerville, ed., Yours, for Probably Always: Martha Gellhorn's Letters of Love and War, 1930–1949, Firefly, 528 pp.), The New York Review of Books, vol. LXVII, no. 15 (8 October 2020), pp. 29–31.
 Elizabeth Perry, Challenging the Mandate of Heaven: Social Protest and State Power in China, Sharpe, 2002, .
 Malise Ruthven, "The Otherworldliness of Ibn Khaldun" (review of Robert Irwin, Ibn Khaldun:  An Intellectual Biography, Princeton University Press, 2018, 243 pp.), The New York Review of Books, vol. LXVI, no. 2 (February 7, 2019), pp. 23–24, 26. 
 George Santayana, The Life of Reason, vol. 1: Reason in Common Sense, 1905.
 Pitirim Aleksandrovich Sorokin, Social and Cultural Dynamics: a Study of Change in Major Systems of Art, Truth, Ethics, Law, and Social Relationships, Boston, Porter Sargent Publishing, 1957, reprinted 1985 by Transaction Publishers.
 Fred Spier, The Structure of Big History:  from the Big Bang until Today, Amsterdam University Press, 1996.
 Sam Tanenhaus, "The Electroshock Novelist:  The Alluring Bad Boy of Literary England Has Always Been Fascinated by Britain's Dustbin Empire.  Now Martin Amis Takes On American Excess," Newsweek, July 2 & 9, 2012, pp. 50–53.
 Arnold J. Toynbee, A Study of History, 12 volumes, Oxford University Press, 1934–61.
 Arnold J. Toynbee, "Does History Repeat Itself?" Civilization on Trial, New York, Oxford University Press, 1948.
 G.W. Trompf, The Idea of Historical Recurrence in Western Thought, from Antiquity to the Reformation, Berkeley, University of California Press, 1979, .
 Mark Twain, The Jumping Frog: In English, Then in French, and Then Clawed Back into a Civilized Language Once More by Patient, Unremunerated Toil, illustrated by F. Strothman, New York and London, Harper & Brothers, Publishers, MCMIII. 
 Paul Wilson, "Adam Michnik:  A Hero of Our Time," The New York Review of Books, vol. LXII, no. 6 (April 2, 2015), pp. 73–75.
 Harriet Zuckerman, Scientific Elite:  Nobel Laureates in the United States, Free Press, 1979.

Further reading
 Bolesław Prus, "Mold of the Earth", an 1884 microstory about the history of the world, reflecting the ebb and flow of human communities and empires.

External links

Cyclical theories
Historiography